Estefanía Soriano (born October 1, 1996) is a judo competitor from the Dominican Republic. She won the gold medal at the 2019 Pan American Games in Lima, Peru, at the 48 kg division.

She has also participated at the 2013 Youth World Championships, the 2014 Youth Olympic Games and the 2019 Senior World Championships.

References

External links
 

1996 births
Living people
Dominican Republic female judoka
Judoka at the 2019 Pan American Games
Pan American Games medalists in judo
Pan American Games gold medalists for the Dominican Republic
Medalists at the 2019 Pan American Games
Judoka at the 2014 Summer Youth Olympics
20th-century Dominican Republic women
21st-century Dominican Republic women